Marjorie Susan Monaghan (born March 19, 1964) is an American actress best known for her portrayal of Tessa Halloran (aka 'Number One') in the television series Babylon 5.

Early life
Monaghan was born  March 19, 1964 in Orange County, California. She is of Irish-Celt ancestry and started acting in high school.

Career
Monaghan has performed in a number of science fiction television roles, including starring as "JoJo" in Space Rangers and an episode of Star Trek: Voyager. In 1999 she appeared in all eight episodes of Rescue 77 as a character named "Kathleen Ryan".

Monaghan is best known for her appearances in 7 episodes Babylon 5 as a character named "Number One" (Tessa Holloran).

Personal life
Monaghan started dating Grant Rosenberg in 2001 whom she later married on February 2, 2011.

Filmography

Film

Television

References

External links
 The Official Marjorie Monaghan Website
 

1964 births
20th-century American actresses
21st-century American actresses
American film actresses
American stage actresses
American television actresses
Actresses from Cincinnati
Place of birth missing (living people)
Living people